Kate Chopin House may refer to:

 Kate Chopin House (Cloutierville, Louisiana), a U.S. National Historic Landmark and listed on the NRHP in Natchitoches County
Kate Chopin House (St. Louis, Missouri), NRHP-listed